Valajanagaram is a village in the Ariyalur taluk of Ariyalur district, Tamil Nadu, India.

Demographics 
 census, Valajanagaram had a total population of 6,013 with 3,063 males and 2,950 females.

References 

Villages in Ariyalur district